The Royal Society for Asian Affairs (RSAA) is a learned society based in London (United Kingdom). Its objective is to advance public knowledge and understanding of Asia through its worldwide networks, its public events, its publications and its support to research. It is independent of governments and political bodies and does not take institutional positions on issues of policy at its meetings or in its publications. 

The Society was founded in 1901 as the Central Asian Society to "promote greater knowledge and understanding of Central Asia and surrounding countries". The geographical extent of the society's interest has since expanded to include the whole of Asia. Taylor & Francis publishes the society's journal, Asian Affairs, which has been in print since 1914.

History 
The society was founded in 1901 to promote greater knowledge and understanding of Central Asia and surrounding countries. But although Central Asia dominated the Society’s early interests, from the outset its members took the view that any Asian developments that could have a bearing on British interests in Central Asia fell within the Society’s remit. So when, in 1975, the Society changed its name to the Royal Society for Asian Affairs, it was acknowledging in its name what had been the practical reality since its earliest days.

Activities 
Meetings were traditionally held at a range of central London locations including the Royal Astronomical Society, the Society of Antiquaries, the Medical Society of London and the Army and Navy Club.  Since the start of the COVID-19 pandemic, all RSAA activities are online and many are open to the general public.  Lectures are given by authoritative speakers roughly every two weeks on current affairs, history, culture and travel connected with all parts of Asia. Members of the Society receive the Society's journal, Asian Affairs, and have free access to the entire back catalogue.  They also have access to other events and social functions.

Education 
The Society's library and archive are currently housed at Hailebury where they may be consulted by prior arrangement. 

The journal of the society, Asian Affairs, is published quarterly by Taylor and Francis. It has been continuously in publication since 1914.  It contains original articles and book reviews.

The Society has for many years run Schools' days jointly with the School of Oriental and African Studies, London for sixth-form students.  These offer interested A-level students an opportunity to hear talks on a wide range of Asian topics and to try out a variety of Asian languages.

Through travel awards to young people, the RSAA supports practical projects and research that have the potential to contribute to advances in scholarly or other public knowledge including, but not limited to, post-graduate degrees, journalism and travel writing.  The Society also administers grants to support medical electives in asian countries on behalf of the JPT Family Trust.

Awards 
The Royal Society for Asian Affairs awards two medals, the "Sir Percy Sykes Memorial Medal" (named for Percy Sykes, honorary secretary 1924-1932) and the "Lawrence of Arabia Memorial Medal", named for T. E. Lawrence, to individuals who have distinguished themselves in their contribution to cultural relations, exploration, research, or literature.

The Society also makes occasional special awards to individuals whose activities merit recognition falling outside the criteria for the Society's two medals.

Notable members 
 George Curzon, 1st Marquess Curzon of Kedleston 
 Ella Sykes, founder member
 Sir Percy Sykes,  (28 February 1867 – 11 June 1945)
 Sir Francis Younghusband,  (31 May 1863 – 31 July 1942)
 K. P. S. Menon CIE ICS (October 18, 1898 – November 22, 1982)
 Vyvyan Holt (1887–1960), diplomat and Oriental scholar, who was captured during the Korean War
 William Anthony Furness, 2nd Viscount Furness (31 March 1929 – 1 May 1995)
 Violet Conolly OBE (11 May 1899 – 11 January 1988)
 Sir Wilfred Thesiger KBE, DSO, FRAS, FRSL, FRGS (3 June 1910 – 24 August 2003)
 F.M. Bailey CIE FRGS (3 February 1882 – 17 April 1967)
 Sir Aurel Stein  KCIE, FRAS, FBA (26 November 1862 – 26 October 1943)
 Lt Col R.C.F. Schomberg (1880-1958)
 Sir Olaf Caroe KCSI KCIE (15 November 1892 – 23 November 1981)
 Peter Hopkirk (died August 2014), writer and traveller

References

External links 
 

1901 establishments in the United Kingdom
Learned societies of the United Kingdom
Organisations based in London with royal patronage
Organizations established in 1901